This is a list of aircraft of the Sri Lanka Air Force and the Sri Lanka Navy Fleet Air Arm (FAA).

List of aircraft alphabetically by manufacturer

A
AAI/IAI RQ-2 Pioneer
Aerospatiale SA 365 Dauphin
Airspeed Oxford
Antonov An-32

B 
BAC Jet Provost
Beechcraft 200
Beechcraft Model 18 (transferred from the Surveyor General's Department)
Bell 47 Sioux
Bell 206 Jet Ranger
Bell 212
Bell 412
Boulton Paul Balliol

C
Cessna 150
Cessna 336 Skymaster
Cessna 421 Golden Eagle
F-7 Skybolt
FT-7M Skybolt
Convair 240

D
de Havilland Canada DHC-1 Chipmunk
de Havilland DH.104 Dove
de Havilland Heron
de Havilland Tiger Moth (Transferred from the Ratmalana Civil Flying Training School)
de Havilland Vampire
Douglas Dakota

F
FMA IA 58 Pucará

H
HAL Chetak (FAA)
Harbin Y-12
Hawker Siddeley HS 748
Hiller UH-12B

I
IAI Kfir
IAI Scout
IAI Searcher Mk II

K
Kamov Ka-26

L
Lockheed Hercules
Lihiniya MK I

M
Mikoyan-Gurevich MiG-15UTI
Mikoyan-Gurevich MiG-17F
Mikoyan-Gurevich MiG-23UB
Mikoyan-Gurevich MiG-27
Mil Mi-17
Mil Mi-24

N
Nanchang CJ-6 (PT-6)
K-8 Karakorum
North American P-51 Mustang

P
Pazmany PL-

S
Scottish Aviation Pioneer
Shaanxi Y-8
Shenyang F-5
Sikorsky H-5 Dragonfly
SIAI Marchetti SF.260TP
SIAI Marchetti SF.260W

T
Taylorcraft Auster

Current aircraft

Attack and Offensive Support Aircraft

IAI Kfir
F-7 Skybolt

Reconnaissance and Maritime Patrol Aircraft

Cessna 421 Golden Eagle
Beechcraft 200
RQ-2 Pioneer
IAI Searcher
IAI Scout
EMIT Blue Horizon 2
Lihiniya MK I

Transport Aircraft

C-130 Hercules
Antonov 32
Harbin Y-12

Attack helicopters

Mil Mi-35
Mil Mi-24

Support and Transport Helicopters

Mil Mi-17
Bell 412
Bell 212
Bell 206

Training Aircraft
K-8 Karakorum
Nanchang CJ-6 (PT-6)
Cessna 150
Chengdu FT-7

Weapons

Air to Air Missiles

 PL-5 Thunderbolt

General-Purpose Bombs

 Mark 83
 Mark 82

Surface to Air Missiles

 SA-16 Gimlet

Air Defense Artillery

 Bofors L40/70 40 mm AA guns 
 ZSU-23-2 twin 23 mm AA guns
 TCM-20  twin 20 mm AA guns

Equipment
INDRA low altitude 2D radar 
CETC YLC-18 3D Radar.
JY-11 Radar low/medium altitude 3D surveillance radar

Surviving SLAF aircraft
Aircraft that have been preserved by the SLAF. A few of these fly but most are held by SLAF Museum.
Airspeed Oxford
Hawker Siddeley HS 748
Sikorsky H-5 Dragonfly
Mikoyan-Gurevich MiG-17F
FMA IA 58 Pucará
BAC Jet Provost
Boulton Paul Balliol
de Havilland Canada DHC-1 Chipmunk
de Havilland Heron
de Havilland Tiger Moth

See also 
 List of aircraft losses of the Sri Lankan Civil War

References

External links
Sri Lankan Air Force
Little known museums of Sri Lanka:A rich collection of artefact's

Sri Lanka Air Force
Sri Lanka
Military equipment of Sri Lanka
Military history of Sri Lanka
Aircraft